Mount Hillary is a mountain located in north County Cork. It is 391m high.

Name

The name Mount Hillary has nothing to do with the forename or surname Hillary. Instead it means 'summit of the partial deafness or echo'. It is also called "Cnoc an Fholair" (Hill of the Eagle) locally.

Transmitter

Mount Hillary is home to the main North Cork transmitter for local services. Red FM's main North Cork transmitter is located near Mallow at Corran Mountain. The multi-city station 4FM's transmitter is located at Bweeng Mountain, 4 km away.

References

Hillary
Marilyns of Ireland